Spaniocelyphus is a genus of beetle flies known from the Indomalayan realm.

Description
Spaniocelyphus may be distinguished by having a sharp vertex, reduced or absent postvertical bristles, and a crossvein separating discal cell from second basal cell.

Species
S. hangchowensis Ouchi, 1939
S. laevis: Malloch, 1929
S. nigrocoeruleus Malloch, 1929
S. palawanensis Vanschuytbroek, 1967
S. palmi Frey, 1941 
S. scutatus (Wiedemann, 1830)
S. viridescens Tenorio, 1969

References

Celyphidae
Diptera of Asia
Lauxanioidea genera